Bulgaria participated at the 2018 Summer Youth Olympics in Buenos Aires, Argentina from 6 October to 18 October 2018.

Athletics

Badminton

Bulgaria qualified one player based on the Badminton Junior World Rankings.

Singles

Team

Boxing

Fencing

Bulgaria qualified one athlete based on its performance at the 2018 Cadet World Championship.

 Girls' Sabre – Yoana Ilieva

Gymnastics

Acrobatic
Bulgaria qualified a mixed pair based on its performance at the 2018 Acrobatic Gymnastics World Championship.

 Mixed pair – 1 team of 2 athletes

Rhythmic
Bulgaria qualified one rhythmic gymnast based on its performance at the European qualification event.

 Girls' rhythmic individual all-around – 1 quota

Judo

Individual

Team

Modern pentathlon

Shooting

Bulgaria qualified one sport shooter based on its performance at the 2017 European Championships. They also qualified a rifle sport shooter based on its performance at the 2018 European Championships.

 Boys' 10m Air Rifle – 1 quota
 Boys' 10m Air Pistol – 1 quota

Individual

Team

Sport climbing

Bulgaria qualified one sport climber based on its performance at the 2017 World Youth Sport Climbing Championships.

 Boys' combined – 1 quota (Petar Ivanov)

Swimming

Tennis

Key

 r = Retired

Singles

Doubles

Weightlifting

Bulgaria qualified one athlete based on its performance at the 2017 World Youth Championships.
Boy

Girl

Wrestling

Key:
  – Without any point scored by the opponent
  – With point(s) scored by the opponent
  – With point(s) scored by the opponent

References

Summer Youth Olympics
Bulgaria
2018